Syed Kaleem Imam is a retired Pakistani police officer who has served as I.G Motorway & Highway Police, IG Punjab and Federal Secretary of Ministry of Narcotics Control.

Early life
Imam was born in Karachi.

Career
Imam became part of civil services of Pakistan on 1 November 1988. A Grade 22 officer, he previously served as Inspector General of Punjab Police from 13.06.2018 to 11.09.2018. He was transferred to Sindh Police as IGSP on 7 September 2018. He served as  Inspector General of Sindh Police (IGSP)  from 7 September 2018 to 28 February 2020. He retired with honour on 25th April 2022 after 33 years plus service.

See also
Central Superior Services

References

Sindhi people
Punjab Police (Pakistan)
Year of birth missing (living people)
Living people
Inspector General of Islamabad Capital Territory Police
Inspector Generals of Sindh Police